Tabadkan (also Romanized as Tabādkān and Tabādkān; also known as Nabādkān and Tabādqān) is a village in Kenevist Rural District, in the Central District of Mashhad County, Razavi Khorasan Province, Iran. At the 2006 census, its population was 1,597, in 418 families.

References 

Populated places in Mashhad County